Eupithecia corralensis is a moth in the  family Geometridae. It is found in the Region of Los Lagos (Valdivia Province) in Chile. The habitat consists of the northern end of the Valdivian Forest Biotic Province.

The length of the forewings is about 8 mm for males. The forewings are dark brown to blackish brown with over greyish white scaling, forming several slender, irregular lines. The hindwings are brownish grey. Adults have been recorded on wing in February.

References

Moths described in 1882
corralensis
Moths of South America
Endemic fauna of Chile